Elena Savoldi (born 11 November 1972) is a former professional tennis player from Italy.

Biography
Savoldi, who comes from Brescia, began her career on the ITF circuit in 1990.

At the 1991 Mediterranean Games in Athens she won a silver medal in the women's doubles event, partnering Francesca Romano.

She reached a career high singles ranking of 134 on the professional tour, with her best WTA Tour performances including a third round appearance at the 1993 Italian Open and a win over Miriam Oremans to make the round of 16 at Taranto in 1994. On the ITF circuit she won six singles titles.

It was as a doubles player that she made her only grand slam main draw appearance, at the 1994 US Open with partner Susanna Attili.

ITF finals

Singles (6-1)

Doubles (4–4)

References

External links
 
 

1972 births
Living people
Italian female tennis players
Sportspeople from Brescia
Competitors at the 1991 Mediterranean Games
Mediterranean Games silver medalists for Italy
Mediterranean Games medalists in tennis
20th-century Italian women